Gayakudu is a 2015 Indian Telugu language romantic drama film directed by Kamal G and produced by Jammalamadu Ravindranath. The film stars Ali Reza and Shriya Sharma. The film's music was composed by Roshan Salur and  the film was released on 20 February 2015.

Cast 

 Ali Reza as Siddansh 
 Shriya Sharma as Akshara
 M. S. Narayana
 Saptagiri
 Guru Charan

Soundtrack 
The film's music score and soundtrack album was composed by Roshan Salur.

Reception 
A writer from 123telugu rated the film 2.25/5 and wrote that

References

External links 

 

2015 films
2015 romantic drama films
2010s Telugu-language films
Indian romantic drama films